MathMagic is a mathematical WYSIWYG equation editor, available for Windows, macOS, Android and iOS since its debut in 1998. MathMagic is known for its DTP quality equations and is widely used by Adobe InDesign and QuarkXPress users. MathMagic is a stand-alone multi-purpose equation editor application, allowing its equation to be used by most software, including word processors, presentation software, DTP layout software, and graphic software.

Product line
The MathMagic product line includes "MathMagic Personal Edition", "MathMagic Pro for Adobe InDesign", "MathMagic Pro for QuarkXPress", and "MathMagic Prime Edition", depending on the configuration and their target market.

In June 2012, "MathMagic Lite Edition", a free version, was introduced for Mac OS X and Android platforms, with some limited features according to their Feature Comparison Table. In September 2014, "MathMagic Lite for Windows" was released. The Lite Edition is currently available on all Android OS, iOS, macOS, and Windows platforms.

Adobe bundled a custom version of MathMagic to Adobe Captivate 7 in 2013 for both macOS and Windows. MathMagic was integrated with Adobe Captivate since Captivate 7 and installed by the Captivate installer.

In 2022, their 64-bit versions of MathMagic were released for 64-bit macOS in Universal binary format for both Intel Macs and M1 Apple silicon Macs.

Features
MathMagic supports MathML, LaTeX, Plain TeX, SVG, ASCIIMath, EPS, PDF, PICT, WMF, JPEG, GIF, BMP, PNG, TIFF,  MathType equations, MS Equation Editor equations, MS Word 2007 equation, Google Docs equation, Zoho Writer equation, Math-To-Speech, and others. Some formats are platform specific.  Although it is a WYSIWYG equation editor, MathMagic allows you type or paste LaTeX expressions directly into the editor window. MathML, ASCIIMathML, and other formats can also be pasted in or copied out. It also supports Text To Speech to read out mathematical expressions via the OS built-in TTS engine or a few internet based remote TTS services.

MathMagic understands a certain level of natural English expressions to convert spoken language based Math reading into equation. For example, pasting "y equals 3x plus 2a minus 2.5 squareroot b" will form

MathMagic Pro comes with all the features of Personal Edition, plus extra features and fonts for high-end users, and Plug-ins or XTensions to work directly with Adobe InDesign or QuarkXPress. MathMagic Pro for Adobe InDesign works with InDesign CS ~ CS6 and CC ~ CC2022. MathMagic Pro for QuarkXPress works with QuarkXPress 6.x ~ 9.x.

MathMagic equation can be pasted into MS Word 2007 or newer's document in MathML format because MS Word's new built-in Equation editor can display and edit MathML.

MathMagic does not support computation.

Competing software
 MathType
 Microsoft Word 2007 equation editor

See also
 Formula editor
 MathML
 LaTeX
 ASCIIMathML

References

External links
 

Mathematical software
Formula editors
Science software
Desktop publishing software